Jeewan Kumaranatunga (born 7 November 1958), is an actor in Sri Lankan cinema, theater and television, who later became a politician, a former member of the parliament and a former cabinet minister. He is a close relative of former President Chandrika Kumaratunga and the nephew of actor and politician Vijaya Kumaratunga.

Family
He was born on 7 November 1958 in Seeduwa. His father Sydney Kumaranatunga was also a film actor who acted in Ran Onchilla. Sydney's brother, Vijaya was a renowned actor and politician. Jeewan completed his education from Carey College, Colombo. His grandfather Benjamin Ralahami also acted in several plays during the Towerhall era.

Jeewan is married to his longtime partner Sherin and they have two daughters - Malsha and Maleesha and one son, Harshamana.

Kumaranatunga's daughter, Malsha, successfully contested the Colombo district seat on the Western Provincial Council in 2014.

Cinema career
Jeevan first acted in school plays while studying at Carey College, Colombo. After joining the scouting troupe, Bermin Laili Fernando encouraged him to act on the school stage. He later made many school plays and performed in bonfire scenes. His play won first place in Sri Lanka's youth talent jamboree as well. Even after leaving school, he established the Sarasavi art circle and performed plays in the village. 

Jeevan first came to acting as a stage actor. He performed about two plays a year on the Polkota Udahadana stage of the University Art Institute established in his village in Seeduwa. After that, he came to get a chance to act for Sudharshi Theatre where he got the opportunity to act in stage dramas like Devlowa Yanakam, Nāyakayā, Juliyā, and Katharagama Rūmathiya. It was during this time that he got an invitation from Ratnaweera de Silva to join the lead role in the film Thani Tharuva. But its producers protested as the shooting approached to cast me in the lead role. At that time, Sanath Gunathilaka who had acted in about five films, was cast as the main character and Jeevan was cast as the villain. There he got to play the role of a "school student".

One of Sri Lanka's best commercially successful film artists, Kumaranatunga started his cinema career alongside his uncle, Vijaya. His maiden cinema acting came through Thani Tharuwa, even though it was released in 1982. His first screened film was Ganga Addara, where he acted in a minor role as Liyana Mahaththaya. He acted in more than 90 films across many genres over the last two decades. He started the cinema through the villainous characters, acted as the main villain in many films such Jaya Sikuruyi, Obaṭa Divurā Kiyannam, Nævatha Hamuvemu, Suraduthiyō, Rūmathiyayi Neethiyayi, and Prārthanā.

He started a very successful journey through his own production, Hitha Honda Chandiya, setting huge records in the cinema. Næva Gilūnath Bǣn Chūn, Mamayi Rajā, Nommara 17, Okkoma Rajavaru, Hitha Honda Sellam, Rajadaruvō, and Come ō Gō Chicāgō reached the pinnacle of acting. His first romantic heroic role came through 1984 film Hitha Honda Kollek directed by Roy de Silva. After that he continued to receive many heroic protagonist roles. During this period, he usually acted with Anoja Weerasinghe, which made them a cinema couple for many years. Some of the most popular Jeewan-Anoja couple films include Mamai Raja, Obata Rahasak Kiyannam, Newatha Api Ekwemu, Randenigala Sinhaya, Yukthiyata Wada, Veera Udara and Esala Sanda. In 1990, he won the Sarasaviya award for the Most Popular Actor.

He acted in about ten television serials, such as Rana Kahawanu, Sudu Paraviyo, Hingana Kolla and Amarapuraya. He produced seven films as a film producer, such as Randeṇigala Sinhayā, Aesala Sanda, Mama Obē Hithavathā, Kadirā, Mē Vaārē Magē, Koṭisanā and Wali Sulanga. But later on, as he got busy with politics, film production got away from him. Ninety percent of the commercial films in which he has acted are very successful as a large number of the films crossed the hundred day mark. He also got to contribute to several dramatic films such as Keḷi Maḍala, Thunveni Aehæ, and Sathyādēvi. He even won the Sarasaviya award for the best supporting actor for the role in the film Kelimandala and also received merit awards.

Politics
In 1991, he went to the Southern Provincial Council election and fulfilled a great responsibility. Then in the 1993 provincial council election, he contested from the Colombo district and won first place. Later he contested the 1994 general election and ranked third in the Colombo district. After that, he got to work in various ministerial positions in the parliament for 23 years. During that time, he ran for five elections and won every time.

Filmography

References

External links
 ජාතික රූපවාහිනියට කළු සෙවනැල්ලක්
 බර්ට්‍රම් ගේ අමරපුරය 3 දා සිට ජීවන් නැවතත් පුංචි තිරයට
 
 ජීවන් කුමාරණතුංග පදනමෙන් ගැබිනි කාන්තාවන් 500 කට ත්‍යාග
 ජීවන් යළි යළිත් රජ වෙයි
 මහින්දාගමනයට කළ කැප වීම ගැන ජීවන් කුමාරතුංගගෙන් හෙළිදරව්වක්
 සේරම පිස්සෝ කියලා ජනතාව තීරණය කරලා

Living people
Sri Lankan actor-politicians
Members of the 10th Parliament of Sri Lanka
Members of the 11th Parliament of Sri Lanka
Members of the 12th Parliament of Sri Lanka
Members of the 13th Parliament of Sri Lanka
Members of the 14th Parliament of Sri Lanka
Posts ministers of Sri Lanka
Sri Lanka Freedom Party politicians
United People's Freedom Alliance politicians
1958 births
Sri Lankan male film actors
Sinhalese male actors
Sports ministers of Sri Lanka
Telecommunication ministers of Sri Lanka